Solute carrier family 12 member 9 (SLC12A9), also known as cation-chloride cotransporter 6 (CCC6) or cation-chloride cotransporter-interacting protein 1 (CIP1), is a protein that in humans is encoded by the SLC12A9 gene.

References

Further reading

Solute carrier family